The New Zealand Electronic Text Collection (NZETC) is a freely accessible online archive of New Zealand and Pacific Islands texts and heritage materials that are held by the Victoria University of Wellington Library. It was named the New Zealand Electronic Text Centre until October 2012.

The Library has an ongoing programme of digitisation and feature additions to the current holdings within the NZETC. In the beginning of 2012 the collection contained over 1,600 texts (around 65,000 pages) and received over 10,000 visits each day.

It is one of two similar collections of older New Zealand publications that have been digitised, the other being the Early New Zealand Books collection from the University of Auckland Library.

Projects and activities
The Library works with partners within Victoria University on projects for the NZETC including:
 Turbine, a literary journal (in cooperation with the International Institute of Modern Letters)
 Best New Zealand Poems (in cooperation with the International Institute of Modern Letters)
 Tidal Pools, to make available texts on Pacific islands history, language, culture and politics (in cooperation with Va'aomanu Pasifika, the Pacific Studies unit)
 Design Review, a Wellington architecture and design magazine from the late 1940s and early 1950s

The NZETC has previously worked with external partners, such as:
 Digitisation and e-publishing of the Transactions and Proceedings of the Royal Society of New Zealand 1868–1961 (in cooperation with the National Library of New Zealand and the Alexander Turnbull Library)
 Learning Media (in cooperation with the Ministry of Education)
 La Trobe Journal (in cooperation with the Australian State Library of Victoria)

Copyrights
When original texts are out of copyright NZETC provides the digitised version under a Creative Commons Share-alike License (currently CC BY SA 3.0 NZ).

Methodology and technology
The NZETC is a part of the Text Encoding Initiative community of practice. They encode all their textual content in TEI XML which is transformed dynamically into HTML using XSLT. Authority files are maintained for works, people, places, organisations and, unusually, ships. Topic Maps are used for the main website structure.

References

External links
 
 NZETC Blog
 Turbine
 Best New Zealand Poems
 Kotare
 Tidal Pools
 Transactions and Proceedings of the Royal Society of New Zealand 1868–1961

New Zealand digital libraries
Victoria University of Wellington
Text Encoding Initiative
Digital Humanities Centers